Šesták or Sestak is a Czech and Slavic surname. It may refer to:

Šestak
 Marija Šestak (born 1979), Slovenian/Serbian triple jumper
 Matija Šestak (born 1972), Slovenian sprinter who specialized in the 400 meters
 Stanislav Šesták (born 1982), Slovak footballer

Sestak
 Luca Sestak (born 1995), German boogie-woogie, blues and jazz pianist
 Joe Sestak (born 1951), American politician and former admiral
 Tom Sestak (1936–1987), American footballer

See also
 Shestak, Nebraska, unincorporated community in Saline County